José "Pepe" Palau Mira (born 24 February 1992) is a Spanish footballer who plays for UD Rayo Ibense as a midfielder.

Club career
Born in Ibi, Province of Alicante, Valencian Community, Palau joined FC Barcelona's youth academy in 2007, at the age of 15. He made his debut as senior on 29 May 2011 with their reserves, playing 14 minutes in a 5–1 home win against UD Salamanca when he was still a Juvenil A player.

In July 2011, Palau signed for Villarreal CF, going on to represent its C and B-teams during his spell. On 13 April 2012, with the latter, he appeared in his second Segunda División match, against UD Almería.

Palau spent the remainder of his career in the lower leagues, representing in quick succession FC Cartagena, FC Jumilla, La Roda CF and CD Eldense.

References

External links

1992 births
Living people
People from Alcoià
Sportspeople from the Province of Alicante
Spanish footballers
Footballers from the Valencian Community
Association football midfielders
Segunda División players
Segunda División B players
Tercera División players
FC Barcelona Atlètic players
Villarreal CF C players
Villarreal CF B players
FC Cartagena footballers
FC Jumilla players
La Roda CF players
CD Eldense footballers